Giorgi Tetrashvili (born 31 August 1993) is a professional rugby union player from Georgia. His position is prop, and he currently plays for Agen in the Top 14 and the Georgia national team.

References 

1993 births
Living people
Georgia international rugby union players
Rugby union props